The Center for Arkansas History and Culture is an archive and educational facility affiliated with the University of Arkansas at Little Rock.

References

External links

 

1978 establishments in Arkansas
Archives in the United States
Organizations established in 1978
University of Arkansas at Little Rock